William Morley Punshon McFee (15 June 1881 – 2 July 1966) was an English writer of sea stories. Both of his parents were Canadian.

Early years 
The son of John McFee and Hilda Wallace McFee, he was born (as was his sister) on the Erin's Isle, a three-masted ship owned by his father, a sea captain, in London, England. The McFee family lived in New Southgate, a northern suburb of London. He was educated at Culford School, in Culford, England.

As a youth, McFee worked in an engineering shop at Aldersgate, wrote a 40-page poem, and lectured on Kipling.

Sailing 
McFee became a mechanical engineer at Richard Moreland & Sons and W. Summerscales & Sons in the City, before going to sea as a marine engineer in 1906. He rose to chief engineer in ships of the Woodfield SS Co.; went to the United States in 1911 and wrote books, afterwards going to sea in ships of the United Fruit Company.During World War I he served in the Royal Navy as engineer in various transport ships.

After the war, he returned to the United States to live in Roxbury, Connecticut. He was with the United Fruit Company, as chief engineer until 1924 when he turned definitively to writing.

Writing 
In addition to books, he also wrote reviews for The New York Sun and The New York Times. One of his reviews was for Save Me the Waltz by Zelda Fitzgerald, in which he said, "In this book, with all its crudity of conception, its ruthless purloinings of technical tricks and its pathetic striving after philosophic profundity, there is the promise of a new and vigorous personality in fiction." Fitzgerald said that of all the negative reviews of her book, his "was at least intelligible."

McFee's works included In the First Watch, an autobiography, published by Random House of Canada in 1946. He wrote several collections of reminiscences; his hobby was making ship models.

Personal life 
While in the navy, McFee met Pauline Khondoff, a Bulgarian refugee. The couple wed in 1920, but divorced in 1932. He was married twice more, first to Beatrice Allender who died in 1952 and then to Dorothy North.

McFee became a United States citizen in 1925.

Recognition
In 1936, Yale University conferred an honorary master of arts degree on McFee.

Works 

 More Harbours of Memory. Doubleday Doran. 1934.

References

Everyman's Dictionary of Literary Biography, English and American (1958)
Love, Paul A. "William McFee." Dictionary of Literary Biography, Late-Victorian and Edwardian British Novelists. Vol. 15. The Gale Group, 1995. 195–203. Gale Literary Databases. 8 December 2008 <http://galenet.galegroup.com>.
"William M'Fee, Author, 85, Dies." New York Times 4 July 1966: 15.
Who Was Who 1897–2006 (2007)

External links 

 
 
 
 "The Market"
 William McFee papers at Charles E. Young Research Library, Los Angeles
 William McFee Collection at Yale University Library

1881 births
1966 deaths
20th-century British novelists
English memoirists
English people of Canadian descent
English male novelists
Writers from London
People educated at Culford School
English short story writers
English male short story writers
Royal Navy personnel of World War I
20th-century British short story writers
20th-century English male writers
English male non-fiction writers